The NHS Redress (Wales) Measure 2008 is the first piece of primary legislation passed by the Welsh Assembly with its greater law-making powers in the wake of the Government of Wales Act 2006. It was passed by the Welsh Assembly on 6 May 2008 and became law on 9 July 2008 when the Queen approved it through an Order in Council of the Privy Council. Only the commencement section came into force on approval with the rest of the measure coming into force on such day or days as the Welsh Ministers may specify by Statutory Instrument.

The primary aim of the legislation is to reform the law of tort in respect of the National Health Service in Wales. Assembly Presiding Officer Dafydd Elis-Thomas said that "[t]he passing of the first assembly measure into law heralds a burgeoning confidence in the new law-making constitution of Wales," and called the measure a "historic milestone for Wales and the National Assembly for Wales".

References

External links
NHS Redress (Wales) Measure 2008 Order in Council Approval

Measures of the National Assembly for Wales
2008 in British law
2008 in Wales
NHS legislation